Jayesh Odedra (born 20 October 1987) is an Indian cricketer who played first-class matches for Saurashtra.

References

External links
 

1987 births
Living people
Indian cricketers
Saurashtra cricketers
Place of birth missing (living people)